Secretoglobin family 3A member 2 is a protein that in humans is encoded by the SCGB3A2 gene.

References

Further reading